Teulisna bipunctata is a moth of the family Erebidae first described by Francis Walker in 1866. It is found on the Moluccas and in Papua New Guinea and Queensland, Australia.

References

bipunctata
Moths described in 1866